Chapar Pord-e Zaman (also Romanized as Chapar Pord-e Zamān; also known as Chapar Pūr-e Zamānī) is a village in Hajji Bekandeh-ye Koshk-e Bijar Rural District, Khoshk-e Bijar District, Rasht County, Gilan Province, Iran. At the 2006 census, its population was 859, in 235 families.

References 

Populated places in Rasht County